Saulius Mykolaitis (January 15, 1966 – February 18, 2006) was a Lithuanian director, actor, and singer-songwriter (bard).

Life
Saulius Mykolaitis was born in Ramygala, a small town in Lithuania. His parents died while he was still studying at school. Saulius was raised by two older brothers Sigitas and Darius who bought him his first guitar when he was just seven years old.

Saulius Mykolaitis started singing and creating songs at school. After graduating he entered Music Academy of Lithuania in Vilnius. Initially he studied singing, but soon moved to acting.

From 1988 to 1992, Saulius Mykolaitis studied at the Music Academy of Lithuania under Professor Dalia Tamulevičiūtė and received a Bachelor's degree in Scene Art (Acting). In 1995 he decided to study for a Master's degree and in 1996 acquired qualification as theatre director.

Mykolaitis committed suicide in 2006 in Vilnius, Lithuania.

Theatrical career
From 1992 to 1994, Mykolaitis worked in Vilnius' National Mažasis (The Small) Theatre. From 1994 until the end of his life Saulius Mykolaitis was a member of Lithuanian National Drama Theatre and also collaborated with Oskaras Koršunovas Theatre.

Through the years Mykolaitis created over 20 roles. The most famous were Mercutio in K. Antanėlis' musical "Love and Death in Verona" (director Eimuntas Nekrošius), Roberto Zucco in Bernard-Marie Koltès' eponymous play (director Oskaras Koršunovas), Azzazelo in Mikhail Bulgakov's "The Master and Margarita" (director Oskaras Koršunovas), The Painter in Howard Barker's "Europeans" (director Lary Zappia).

Directed plays
Mykolaitis was not only performing in other directors' plays. He directed – and received renown for – several productions himself, the most important being (in which he also played leads), "Stop Machine" and "The City".

"Stop Machine" was based on Russian satirist's Daniil Charms' life and short stories, a performance that combined physical and psychological theatre.
"Once Petrushevsky broke his watch and asked to call Pushkin. Pushkin came, took a look at Petrushevsky's watch and put it back on the chair. "So what do you say, brother Pushkin?" – asked Petrushevsky. "Stop machine," – said Pushkin." (Anecdotes from the life of Pushkin)

 Daniil Charms. Stop Machine (Stop Mašina). LNDT, 2000
 Anton Chekhov. Ivanov (Ivanovas). LNDT, 2002
 A. A. Milne. Winnie The Pooh (Mikė Pūkuotukas). Keistuolių theatre, 2003
 Yevgeni Grishkovets. The City (Miestas). OKT (Theatre of Oskaras Koršunovas), 2005
 Antoine de Saint-Exupéry. The Little Prince (Mažasis Princas). LNDT, 2006

Film and music
Aside from theatre, Mykolaitis had three supporting film roles. The last one was in "Dievų miškas" (Forest of the Gods) (2005), a feature directed by Algimantas Puipa.

Saulius Mykolaitis also wrote and performed songs in the genre of sung poetry, playing the guitar. His first album "Nieko Nepasakyta" ("Nothing's Said") was released in autumn 2005. Posthumously his songs for children's plays were collected in an album called "Nupiešti Pasaulį" ("To Draw the World") (2006), followed by a compilation "Debesys" ("The Clouds") (2007), consisting of non-professional live recordings.

References

External links
 Official site of Saulius Mykolaitis (Lithuanian)
 Interview with Saulius Mykolaitis about his first music album (Lithuanian)
 Saulius Mykolaitis page at Lithuanian National Drama Theatre site (Lithuanian)
 Watch "Roberto Zucco" online

1966 births
20th-century Lithuanian male singers
Suicides in Lithuania
People from Ramygala
Musicians from Vilnius
Lithuanian Academy of Music and Theatre alumni
2006 suicides